South Carolina Highway 113 (SC 113) is a  state highway in the U.S. state of South Carolina. The highway connects rural areas of Aiken and Lexington counties with Wagener.

Route description
SC 113 begins at an intersection with SC 394 (Salley Road) west of Salley, within Aiken County, where the roadway continues as South Dixie Road. It travels to the north-northwest and immediately curves to the north-northeast before crossing over Dean Swamp Creek. SC 113 curves back to the north-northwest. It heads north just before entering Wagener. It passes Wagener–Salley High School. It curves to the north-northeast and begins a concurrency with SC 302 (Aiken Road). The concurrency intersects SC 39 (Railroad Street). Just over  later, SC 113 and SC 302 split, with SC 113 heading to the north-northwest. The highway passes Cyril B. Busbee Elementary School and A.L. Corbett Middle School just before leaving town. It curves to the north-northeast. It curves back to the north-northwest and crosses the North Edisto River, where it enters Lexington County. The highway curves to the north-northeast and meets its northern terminus, an intersection with U.S. Route 178 (US 178; Fairview Road). Here, the roadway continues as Calks Ferry Road.

History

Major intersections

See also

References

External links

 
 Mapmikey's South Carolina Highways Page: SC 113

113
Transportation in Aiken County, South Carolina
Transportation in Lexington County, South Carolina